Truth: Red, White & Black is a seven-issue comic book limited series written by Robert Morales, drawn by Kyle Baker and published by Marvel Comics. The series focuses on Isaiah Bradley, one of 300 African American soldiers experimented on by the US Army in an attempt to create super soldiers. Elements of Truth are adapted for the Disney+ series The Falcon and the Winter Soldier, set in the Marvel Cinematic Universe.

Publication history 
Published from January 2003 to July 2003, the series Truth: Red, White & Black is composed of seven comics: "The Future", "The Basics", "The Passage", "The Cut", "The Math", "The Whitewash" and "The Blackvine". The series was announced as six issue series, but was later extended to seven. The cover of the first two issues include the text "Part I of VI" and "Part II of VI"; the later issues read "... of VII".

The trade paperback collecting the series was published in February 2004 and the hardcover in 2009. The book version of Truth contains Morales's appendix in which he clarifies myth, history and imagination and provides sources for his story. A new trade paperback edition was released in February 2022, under the title Captain America: Truth.

Concept and creation
The original concept for the character came from an offhand comment by Marvel's publisher, Bill Jemas. Axel Alonso was taken by the idea "inherent of politics of wrapping a Black man in red, white, and blue" and "a larger story ... a metaphor of America itself"; he also immediately thought of the Tuskegee Study. In a meeting involving Joe Quesada, Alonso proceeded to pitch the idea to Robert Morales, who was brought in to write the story and create the supporting cast and the ending. The idea of an African American Captain America made Morales laugh, but, once he heard the premise, he found it depressing. He says he "wrote a proposal that was so staggeringly depressing I was certain they'd turn it down. But they didn't."

Morales originally envisioned the character as a scientist who experimented on himself, a reference to Silver Age scientists Reed Richards and Bruce Banner; however, Marvel wanted a more explicit reference to the Tuskegee Syphilis Study. Morales was able to push through an ending in which Bradley suffered brain damage, a reference to Muhammad Ali that gave the character a tragic ending. Morales performed extensive research into the time period, which he balanced with editorial suggestions. Bradley's strong marriage came from an unsuccessful Luke Cage proposal by Brian Azzarello.

Synopsis 

Set in the Marvel Universe, the series takes the Tuskegee Experiments as inspiration for a tale that re-examines the history of the super-soldier serum that created Captain America. Beginning in 1942, the series follows a regiment of black soldiers who are forced to act as test subjects in a program attempting to re-create the lost formula earlier used to turn Steve Rogers into Captain America. The experiments lead to mutation and death, until only one remains: Isaiah Bradley.

Analysis 
In Super Black: American Pop Culture and Black Superheroes, Adilifu Nama notes that "Truth admonished the reader to incorporate the experiences and histories of black folk that paint a different picture of the cost and quest for freedom and democracy in America."

Critical reaction 
Axel Alonso felt some of the criticism for this series came from "outright racists who just don't like the idea of a black man in the Cap uniform."

In an interview with Comic Book Resources, he recalled:
When we posted our first image of Isaiah Bradley – the silhouette of an African American man in a Captain America costume – the media latched onto it as a story of interest, but a lot of internet folks lined up against it, assuming, for whatever reason, that it would disparage the legacy of Steve Rogers. By the time the story was done, the dialog around the series had substantially changed. One high-profile reviewer even wrote a column admitting he'd unfairly pre-judged the series, that he now saw it was about building bridges between people, not burning them – which I deeply respected. It's especially meaningful when you edit a story that functions as a little more than pure entertainment.

Captain America timeline
Clarifying the timeline for Isaiah Bradley and Steve Rogers—and who predates whom—Robert Morales states in his appendix to the Truth: Red, White & Black trade paperback collection (2004):

Truth co-creator Kyle Baker further clarified the respective timelines of Bradley and Rogers in an interview:

In other media

Elements of the comic are adapted for the Disney+ series The Falcon and the Winter Soldier, set in the Marvel Cinematic Universe.

References

External links
 
 
 Reliving World War II With a Captain America of a Different Color, New York Times, December 1, 2002
 Review: Truth: Red, White, and Black at PaperbackReader.com
 Truth made visible: crises of cultural expression in truth: Red, White, and Black.
 Remediating Blackness and the Formation of a Black Graphic Historical Novel Tradition by Adam Kendall Coombs, Master These.

2003 comics debuts
2003 comics endings